Fatimah Nyeema Warner (born September 18, 1991), known professionally as Noname (pronounced "no name"), is an American rapper, poet, and record producer. Since 2019, Noname has run a book club focused on radical texts by authors of color. She is also one-third of the musical supergroup Ghetto Sage with fellow rappers Smino and Saba.

Noname began rapping and performing slam poetry in 2010, and gained wider recognition in 2013 for her appearance on the track "Lost" from Chance the Rapper's mixtape Acid Rap. Noname released her debut mixtape, Telefone, on July 31, 2016, to critical acclaim. Her debut album, Room 25, was released on September 14, 2018 and received further critical acclaim.

Early life
Noname grew up in the Bronzeville neighborhood of Chicago. She was raised by her grandparents until she was in middle school. When she returned to live with her mother, she had a new sibling and she and her mother did not get along.

As a teenager, she listened to blues musicians Buddy Guy and Howlin' Wolf, and spent time in her mother's bookstore. She started writing poetry after taking a creative writing class in high school. As a teen, she spent time in the YOUMedia project, a space for young artists to create and network then based at the Harold Washington Library. There, she befriended many local talents, including Chance the Rapper.

Career

2010–2015: Early works 
Noname's interest in poetry led her to compete in local open mics and slam poetry competitions; she took third place in Chicago's annual Louder Than a Bomb competition. Noname then started to freestyle rap with friends, collaborating with local Chicago artists including Chance the Rapper, Saba, and Mick Jenkins.

In 2013, she appeared on Chance the Rapper's second mixtape, Acid Rap, contributing a verse to the track "Lost" and singing the chorus. She later contributed a verse to the song "Finish Line/Drown" from Chance the Rapper's 2016 mixtape Coloring Book. In December 2016, she appeared with Chance the Rapper on Saturday Night Live. She announced her first tour on November 13, 2016.

In 2014, she was featured on Mick Jenkins's mixtape The Waters, contributing to the track "Comfortable". In 2015, she was featured on multiple tracks from Kirk Knight's album Late Knight Special. That year, she also featured on fellow Chicago rapper Ramaj Eroc's single "I Love You More".

2016–2017: Telefone 

Noname first used the stage name "Noname Gypsy", which she chose as a teenager when she was transitioning from poetry to music, believing "gypsies were very nomadic, just not about staying in one space for a long time". In March 2016, she removed "Gypsy" from her stage name after learning of its racial connotation, saying she had been unaware of its negative connotations and did not want to offend Romani people. In a 2016 interview with The Fader, she explained her current stage name, following the change:

I try to exist without binding myself to labels. I’m not really into labels at all, even the way I dress; I usually don't wear anything with a name brand. For me, not having a name expands my creativity. I’m able to do anything. Noname could potentially be a nurse. Noname could be a screenwriter. I’m not limited to any one category of art or other existence, on a more existential level.

Noname released her first mixtape, Telefone, on July 31, 2016, after three years of production. Telefone publicized her new stage name through songs presented as open-ended telephone conversations. The album centers on important telephone conversations Noname has had. Her rap speaks of black women's pain and highlights the struggles of growing up in Chicago. The album was originally released as a free download on Bandcamp, and then on vinyl in September 2017.Rolling Stone called it one of 2016's "most thought-provoking hip-hop." Stereogum wrote that Noname possessed "a potency and urgency in her complicated, spoken word-esque cadences and subdued delivery that escapes many of her more animated peers." Consequence of Sound wrote that "the louder her music is played, the brighter her cadence glows, giving her lyrics a type of 3D craft that makes Telefone a diary of lessons too relevant to keep to yourself."

In October 2016, Noname and fellow Chicago resident Saba collaborated to produce "Church/Liquor Store", a song that explores the Westside of Chicago, where liquor stores sit directly next to places of worship. Noname critiques the gentrification of the neighborhood and the erasure of crime believed to accompany it.

Noname performed a NPR Tiny Desk Concert in April 2017.

2018–2019: Room 25 

In August 2018, Noname announced that her second album, Room 25, would be released in fall 2018. The album, which took about a month to record, chronicles the two years since the release of Telefone, during which she moved from Chicago to Los Angeles and had a short romantic relationship.

Noname compared her maturity on Room 25 to Telefone, saying "Telefone was a very PG record because I was very PG. I just hadn't had sex." Unlike Telefone, Room 25 was created due to a financial obligation. Noname said in an interview, "It came to a point where it was, like, I needed to make an album because I need to pay my rent. I could've done another Telefone tour, but I can't play those songs anymore. Like, I could, but I physically hate it because I've just been playing them for so long." Noname paid for the entire album herself using money from touring and guest appearances on Chance the Rapper projects.

The album was released on September 14, 2018. El Hunt of NME called the album "flawless" and "smartly constructed and laced with intricate subtlety." Rolling Stone said Noname was "One of the best rappers alive" and included her on a list of "Artists You Need to Know". Pitchfork designated Room 25 as "Best New Music" and wrote that it is "a transcendent coming-of-age tale built around cosmic jazz and neo-soul, delivered by a woman deeply invested in her interiority and that of the world around her."  PopMatters said the album was "vintage neo-soul and future rap hand in hand; a soulful sanctuary for those turned off by the austerity of mainstream mumble rap". Noname performed a three-song medley of "Blaxploitation," "Prayer Song," and "Don't Forget About Me" from the album in her solo television debut on The Late Show with Stephen Colbert on October 17, 2018.

2019–present: Factory Baby and hiatus 
On May 15, 2019, Noname announced that her upcoming second studio album would be titled Factory Baby. She also formed the trio Ghetto Sage with Smino and Saba.

In November 2019, Noname announced she was considering quitting music and expressed frustration with her predominantly white audience. She went on to say that the demographics of her fanbase made her want to quit music: "I refuse to keep making music and putting it online for free for people who won’t support me. If y'all don't wanna leave the crib I feel it. I don't want to dance on a stage for white people." In 2020, she reiterated that her music career was on pause to focus on education and her book club.

On June 18, 2020, two days after J. Cole had seemingly criticized her activism in his song "Snow on tha Bluff", Noname released the Madlib-produced "Song 33", in which she alluded to Cole and reflected on violence against black women, mainly the death of 19-year-old Black Lives Matter activist Oluwatoyin Salau. She expressed regret at responding to Cole, saying that although she had tried to "use it as a moment to draw attention back to the issues" she cares about, she apologized "for any further distraction this caused." She did not take the song down, instead donating all proceeds to black mutual aid funds.

On August 7, 2020, Noname appeared on a remix to Anderson Paak's "Lockdown", along with JID and Jay Rock. In February 2021, she revealed she had turned down an offer to be on the soundtrack for Judas and the Black Messiah after seeing the film, criticizing the film for not centering Fred Hampton's "radical communist politics".

On December 5, 2021, Noname announced on Instagram that her album Factory Baby, originally due to be released in 2021, had been canceled and that she would be taking an indefinite hiatus from music.

In early April 2022, Noname posted to her Instagram that "maybe 30 is too young to retire." She has also posted several pictures of herself in her home studio working on new material. For the first time since before the pandemic, Noname performed at the Afropunk festival in Minneapolis on April 19, 2022. She also performed at the 2022 Pitchfork Music Festival. She then announced that she will release her long-awaited third studio album.

Noname Book Club 
In July 2019, Noname created a book club. She came up with the idea after a fan commented on Twitter that they were reading the same book as her, Jackson Rising, about Cooperation Jackson. The book club encourages support of locally owned bookstores, with her website providing a directory of bookstores owned by people of color. Noname described the book club as "a little bit of a fuck you to Amazon, and kind of a fuck you to the FBI," referencing how the FBI's COINTELPRO program had targeted Black independent booksellers. The book club has partnerships with libraries in Oakland, Chicago, New York, and Los Angeles, where the libraries promote and help readers find the chosen books. It also hosts discussions on the literature and donates books to prisons.

The book club chooses two books a month. The first two books chosen were Pedagogy of the Oppressed by Paulo Freire and We Are Never Meeting in Real Life by Samantha Irby. Celebrities sometimes choose a book, including Kehlani (choosing Parable of the Sower by Octavia E. Butler) and Earl Sweatshirt (choosing Faces & Masks (Memory of Fire, Vol. 2) by Eduardo Galeano). The book club aims to provide a "radical curated book list" and has been described by Vogue as focusing on "anti-capitalist and radical leftist literature".

In January 2020, Noname created "Library Card Registration Day" asking people to go to their local libraries on January 11 and register for a library card. She called the day "basically an 'F you' to major corporations who have privatized the way we consume goods and services," specifically referencing how her mother's bookstore had closed due to Amazon. Noname also called for her followers to end their subscriptions with Amazon, tweeting that Amazon had "created a consumer model that is extremely addictive and removes human compassion. We don’t think about the workers who are underpaid and exploited. We just want our next-day delivery."

In March 2021, Noname revealed on her Instagram story that work on a physical headquarters for Noname Book Club had begun, which would act as a center for political education classes, book drives, a library, food drives, book club meet-ups, tent drives, free art shows, free movie screenings, and more. In April 2021, Haymarket Books donated 180 titles to the book club's personal collection of reading material, which Noname called a "radical community library."

Influences 
Musically and stylistically, Noname has credited Avril Lavigne, Nina Simone, André 3000, and Missy Elliott as her influences. She cites the author Toni Morrison and poet Patricia Smith as notable influences on her writing style. Her most recent work revolves around themes of social injustices, inspired by anti-capitalist theories.

Discography

Studio albums

Mixtape

Singles

Guest appearances

References

External links
 
 Official Book Club website

1991 births
Living people
21st-century American rappers
21st-century American women musicians
African-American women rappers
African-American poets
American anti-capitalists
American socialists
Feminist musicians
Illinois socialists
Patreon creators
Police abolitionists
Prison abolitionists
Rappers from Chicago
21st-century women rappers